Cashiers du Cinemart was an American magazine and an online magazine about independent film, published and edited by Mike White. The print version began in 1994 as a zine and evolved over the late 1990s into a more typical magazine format. The title is a reference to the French film magazine, Cahiers du cinéma.  It ceased print publication temporarily in 2008, but continues on the Internet and via print on demand issues. The Cashiers du Cinemart writers include Skizz Cyzyk, Leon Chase, Karen Lillis, Mike Malloy, David MacGregor, Andrew Grant, Mike Z, Terry Gilmer, Rich Osmond, Mike Thompson and more.

History
Cashiers du Cinemart openly mocked the basic tenets of film criticism and theory while championing underground and independent film.  The magazine became known for its edgy writing and incendiary opinions, as well as its obsessive love for offbeat films. 

In 2010, BearManor Media published a collection of articles from Cashiers du Cinemart titled Impossibly Funky.

In 2011, despite saying that Cashiers du Cinemart had ended its run in 2007, new issues were published via print on demand and e-publishing.

References

Film magazines published in the United States
Online magazines published in the United States
Magazines established in 1994
Online magazines with defunct print editions
Internet properties established in 1994
Magazines disestablished in 2008
Defunct magazines published in the United States